Route 322 is an  local highway in northwestern New Brunswick, Canada. The road runs from New Brunswick Route 315 in Bathurst to its northern terminus at New Brunswick Route 315 in Nigadoo, as it runs parallel to the west of Route 315.

Communities along Route 322
 Bathurst
 Robertville
 Saint-Laurent
 Nigadoo

See also
List of New Brunswick provincial highways

References

322
322
Transport in Bathurst, New Brunswick